Sir Nicholas John Shackleton  (23 June 1937 – 24 January 2006) was an English geologist and paleoclimatologist who specialised in the Quaternary Period. He was the son of the distinguished field geologist Robert Millner Shackleton and great-nephew of the explorer Ernest Shackleton.

Education and employment

Educated at Cranbrook School, Kent (thanks to the generosity of a person he called his "fairy godmother" as she paid his school fees) Shackleton went on to read natural sciences at Clare College, Cambridge. He graduated with the Bachelor of Arts degree in 1961, promoted in 1964 to Master of Arts. In 1967 Cambridge awarded him a PhD degree, for a thesis entitled "The Measurement of Paleotemperatures in the Quaternary Era".

Apart from periods abroad as Visiting Professor or Research Associate, Shackleton's entire scientific career was spent at Cambridge. He became Ad hominem Professor in 1991, in the Department of Earth Sciences, working in the Godwin Institute for Quaternary Research.

Paleoceanography

Shackleton was a key figure in the field of paleoceanography, publishing over two hundred scientific papers. He was a pioneer in the use of mass spectrometry to determine changes in climate as recorded in the oxygen isotope composition of calcareous microfossils. Shackleton also found evidence that the Earth's last magnetic field reversal was 780,000 years ago. He became internationally known, in 1976, with the publication of a paper, with James Hays and John Imbrie, in Science entitled "Variations in the Earth's orbit: Pacemaker of the ice ages". Using ocean sediment cores, Shackleton, Hays and Imbrie demonstrated that oscillations in climate over the past few million years could be correlated with variations in the orbital and positional relationship between the Earth and the Sun (see Milankovitch cycles).

Much of Shackleton's later work focused on constructing precise timescales based on matching the periodic cycles in deep-sea sediment cores to calculations of incoming sunlight at particular latitudes over geological time. This method allows a far greater level of stratigraphic precision than other dating methods, and has also helped to clarify the rates and mechanisms of aspects of climate change.

In September 2000 Shackleton published an innovative study of the relationship between the oxygen isotope record of the oceans and isotope records obtained from the ice in Antarctica (glacial effect). This helped to identify the relative contribution of deep water temperature changes and ice volume changes to the marine isotopic record, and also highlighted the close interdependency between carbon dioxide levels and temperature change over the last 400,000 years.

In 1995 Shackleton became Director of the Godwin Institute for Quaternary Research. In 1998 he was knighted for his services to earth sciences. From 1999 to 2003 he was president of the International Union for Quaternary Research (INQUA). In 2010 Nick Shackleton was one of ten scientists depicted on a set of postage stamps, in commemoration of the 350th anniversary of the Royal Society. Shackleton was chosen to represent Earth Science.

The European Association of Geochemistry quinquennially awards a Science Innovation Award medal named in his honour for work in climatology.

Clarinet

Shackleton was also a skilled amateur clarinet player, and collector of woodwind instruments. During his lifetime he amassed a large collection of clarinets and related instruments. His Cambridge home became a place of pilgrimage for many players and scholars. Shackleton was internationally known as an organologist, reflected in his many journal articles, as well as his contributions to the 1980 and 2001 editions of The New Grove Dictionary of Music and Musicians, as well as the Grove Dictionary of Musical Instruments. Most of Shackleton's substantial instrument collection, numbering over 700 instruments, was bequeathed to the University of Edinburgh together with an endowment. Part of the collection is now exhibited at the Reid Concert Hall, as part of Edinburgh University's Collection of Historic Musical Instruments. The collection has been described in a published catalogue .

In addition to his reputation in the scientific world, Shackleton was highly respected by many musicians, and a friend to many who studied at Cambridge, including Christopher Hogwood who lodged with him for several years. The fine copies, by Cambridge maker Daniel Bangham, of many clarinets in Shackleton's collection, had a significant impact on historical performance from the 1980s, and continue to be used by leading performers today.

Personal life
From 1986 to 2002, Shackleton was married to Vivien Law, a linguistic scholar.

Awards

Doctor of Science (ScD), University of Cambridge 1984
Fellow of the Royal Society (FRS) 1985
Francis P. Shepard Medal for marine geology (SEPM) 1985
Carus Medal, Deutsche Akademie für Naturforscher 'Leopoldina' 1985
Lyell Medal, Geological Society of London 1987
Founding member, Academia Europaea 1988
Fellow, American Geophysical Union 1990
A.G. Huntsman Award for Excellence in the Marine Sciences (Bedford Institute of Oceanography Canada) 1990
Crafoord Prize, Royal Swedish Academy of Sciences 1995
Honorary Doctor of Laws, Dalhousie University Canada 1996
Wollaston Medal, Geological Society of London 1996
Honorary Doctor of Philosophy, Stockholm University 1997
Knighthood for services to the earth sciences in 1998
Milutin Milankovic Medal, European Geophysical Society 1999
Foreign Associate, US National Academy of Sciences 2000
Foreign Member, Royal Netherlands Academy of Arts and Sciences, 2001
Honorary Doctorate, Geology, University of Padova, Italy, 2002
Maurice Ewing Medal, American Geophysical Union 2002
Honorary member, EUG 2003
Urey Medal, 2003
Royal Medal, Royal Society of London 2003
Vetlesen Prize, Lamont–Doherty Earth Observatory of Columbia University 2004
Fellow of the American Association for the Advancement of Science 2004
Founder's Medal, Royal Geographical Society 2005
Blue Planet Prize, Asahi Glass Foundation, Japan 2005

References

External links
 A special issue of Quaternary Science Reviews dedicated to Nick Shackleton; includes several articles by and about him, as well as a complete list of his publications.
Tributes to Nicholas Shackleton

1937 births
2006 deaths
20th-century British geologists
British climatologists
Fellows of the Royal Society
Knights Bachelor
Alumni of Clare College, Cambridge
Fellows of Clare College, Cambridge
Wollaston Medal winners
Members of Academia Europaea
Royal Medal winners
Lyell Medal winners
People educated at Cranbrook School, Kent
Members of the Royal Netherlands Academy of Arts and Sciences
Foreign associates of the National Academy of Sciences
Fellows of the American Geophysical Union
Recipients of the Royal Geographical Society Founder's Medal